Rochester Community Schools District includes 523 acres of property encompassing 66 square miles primarily in the City of Rochester Hills, the City of Rochester, and Oakland Township, as well as parts of Orion Township and Auburn Hills in northeast Oakland County and parts of Shelby Township and Washington Township in northwest Macomb County, in the U.S. state of Michigan. It currently has upwards of 15,000 students, all located in Rochester Hills and Oakland Township, Michigan.  The Administration Center is located in the city of Rochester.

Administration Center
Superintendent: Robert Shaner, Ph.D.

Deputy Superintendent for Teaching and Learning: Debi Fragomeni

Rochester Community Schools Board of Education
Michelle Bueltel, Barbara Anness, Kristin Bull, Jessica Gupta, Carol Beth Litkouhi, Scott Muska, and
Andrew Weaver

Student facts

High schools
 Rochester Adams High School
Rochester High School
Stoney Creek High School

Middle schools
Hart Middle School
Reuther Middle School
Van Hoosen Middle School
West Middle School

Elementary schools
Baldwin Elementary School
Brewster Elementary School
Brooklands Elementary School
Delta Kelly Elementary School
Hamlin Elementary School
Hampton Elementary School
Hugger Elementary School
Long Meadow Elementary School
McGregor Elementary School
Meadow Brook Elementary School
Musson Elementary School
North Hill Elementary School
University Hills Elementary School

References

External links
 

School districts in Michigan
Education in Oakland County, Michigan